Janick Maceta del Castillo (born 9 March 1994) is a Peruvian model and beauty pageant titleholder who was crowned Miss Peru 2020. She represented Peru at the Miss Universe 2020 pageant and finished second runner-up.

Previously, she was appointed as Miss Peru Supranational 2019. She represented Peru at the Miss Supranational 2019 pageant and finished third runner-up.
This is the second time won the third runner-up when Claudia Villafuerte was also the third runner-up in 2010.

Career 
Janick Maceta del Castillo was born on March 9, 1994, in Lima, Peru, into a middle-class family with roots from Trujillo and Chanchamayo. She stated in an interview with Telemundo that her mother worked as an English teacher, while her father was a police officer involved in anti-terrorist investigations.

Maceta is the founder of the nonprofit Foundation called "Little Heroes Peru", created in favor of children who are or have been victims of sexual violence. She also has a bill in her country for the automatic application of the Gessel camera for sexually violated children. She hopes that the Peruvian Congress will approve her law as soon as possible. Janick is also a co-founder of the Record Label Top of New York, a company that is responsible for digitizing and producing the musical content of young talents so that they have material with which they can make their way into the music industry.

Pageantry 
On January 27, 2018, Maceta competed in the Miss Tourism World 2017/2018 pageant, held at the Swiss Garden Hotel in Malacca City, Malaysia, where she placed first runner-up.

On November 29, 2020, Maceta was crowned Miss Peru 2020. This made her the official candidate of Peru for Miss Universe 2020 which took place mid 2021 after being postponed from late 2020 due to the COVID-19 pandemic in Peru.

Maceta placed second runner-up in Miss Universe 2020. This is second time Peru placed in the Top 5 of Miss Universe and the second highest placement Peru has ever achieved since Gladys Zender won the title in 1957.

References

External links
 
 
UP CLOSE: Miss Universe Peru

1994 births
Living people
Peruvian people of Lebanese descent
Beauty pageant contestants
Miss Supranational contestants
Miss Universe 2020 contestants
Miss Peru